is a Japanese ballet dancer.

Career 
Tsukamoto started ballet at the age of 7, studying at the Tachibana Ballet School.

She is a member of Asami Maki Ballet Tokyo, and is a client of the agency Bound Promotion. 

In addition to ballet, Tsukamoto also performs as a film actress.

Filmography

Film

TV commercials 
 Daio Paper Corporation - Elis Megami

References

External links 
 Interview with ballet dancer Nami Tsukamoto Ballet-Japon, accessed September 5, 2013. 

Japanese film actresses
Japanese ballerinas
People from Shizuoka Prefecture
1979 births
Living people
21st-century Japanese actresses